The Battle of Alcolea took place on 28 September 1868, over a bridge above Guadalquivir river in the town of Alcolea, Córdoba, Spain. In this battle, revolutionary forces led by General Francisco Serrano y Domínguez defeated Queen Isabella II of Spain's governmental forces commanded by general Manuel Pavía, forcing her to leave Spain and be exiled in France.

Precedent
Under Isabelle II's reign, a monopoly of the Government by the Moderate Party was supported. In order to end this system, alternative forces like the Progressive Party and Democratic Party signed the Ostend Agreement in 1866, in which they were committed to depose Queen Isabella II.       

Battles involving Spain
History of the province of Córdoba, Spain